Overcome is the fourth studio album by the American metalcore band All That Remains. It was released on September 19, 2008. Overcome is the first album by All That Remains that was not produced by Adam Dutkiewicz of Killswitch Engage and also the first album with drummer Jason Costa.

Overview
On July 21, 2008, two tracks from the new album - "Before the Damned" and "Relinquish" - made their first appearance on the band's MySpace profile. Commenting on the tracks, vocalist Philip Labonte stated, "This represents the heavier side of ATR. Last time we did this we put up 'The Weak Willed' and we feel like it's a bit of a tradition to really kick you in the nuts when we first show off new stuff! So here is the heaviest stuff we came up with for 'Overcome.'" "Chiron" made its first appearance on August 11, 2008, on the band's MySpace profile. The song was the first single from the album, with a behind-the-scenes shoot up and the official music video submitted to YouTube.

Two of the album's tracks, "Two Weeks" and "Chiron", were made available as downloadable content for Rock Band on September 9, 2008. The tracks were exclusive to Rock Band for one week before the album was released.

"Two Weeks" was added to the band's MySpace page on September 8, 2008, to help promote the release of the song pack on Rock Band. It is the album's second single and a music video has been released for it. The song has since become their biggest hit to date, entering the top ten on Billboard's Mainstream Rock Tracks.

The album entered the Billboard 200 at #16, and has sold over 200,000 copies.

The band released their third single from the album, "Forever In Your Hands", to radio on June 15, 2009. This also featured an acoustic version of the song, the first time the band had released an acoustic song.

On October 7, 2009, the band released the bonus track "Frozen", previously available in Japan only, as a free download from their website.  On the same day, a music video for "Forever In Your Hands" was released.

On March 17, 2010, "Days Without" was released on the Rock Band Network as a downloadable song. On April 8, 2010, "Forever In Your Hands" followed. Finally, "Undone" was released on April 27, 2010.

Track listing

Personnel

All That Remains
 Philip Labonte – lead vocals
 Oli Herbert – lead guitar
 Mike Martin – rhythm guitar
 Jeanne Sagan – bass guitar
 Jason Costa – drums

Production
 Jason Suecof – producer, engineer
 Mark Lewis – additional and mix engineering
 Ted Pierce – additional engineering
 Ryan Smith – mastering at Sterling Sound, New York, NY

Management
 E.J. Johantgen and Dan Fitzgerald – A&R
 Stephen Hutton and Lucas Keller for Uppercut Management
 Mike McKoy – legal representation for Serling, Rooks & Ferrara
 Josh Kline – booking for The Agency Group
 Murray Richman – business management for Richman Business Management

Artwork
 Carson Slovak – artwork design and layout

Charts

References

2008 albums
All That Remains (band) albums
Prosthetic Records albums
Razor & Tie albums
Albums produced by Jason Suecof